Alone: Ballads for Solo Piano is a 2007 studio album by the jazz pianist André Previn.

Alone peaked at number 8 on the Billboard Top Jazz Albums chart.

Reception

The album was positively reviewed by Allmusic who wrote that "Don't hate him because he's popular...or because of his sundry talents. ...Previn's style is melodious and easygoing...but he can swing up a storm when he wants to." Allmusic described the mood of the album as "decidedly relaxed and touched with nostalgia as Previn embraces a set of emotionally charged standards." Harvey Siders reviewed Alone for the Jazz Times and wrote that "This collection of standards plus three originals reveals his prodigious technique along with other trademarks. Most notable is his ability to change keys in the most unexpected places." Siders particularly highlighted the key changes on "Skylark" and Previn's "gift for serious re-harmonization" on "It Might as Well Be Spring" and likened the bi-tonality of "My Ship" to the rose motif from Richard Strauss's Der Rosenkavalier.

Track listing 
 "Angel Eyes" (Earl Brent, Matt Dennis) - 3:42
 "The Second Time Around" (Sammy Cahn) - 3:19
 "André's Blues" (André Previn) - 2:21
 "Darkest Before the Dawn" (Johnny Mercer, A. Previn) - 2:06
 "What Is This Thing Called Love" (Cole Porter) - 2:14
 "Night and Day" (Porter) - 3:54
 "Bewitched, Bothered and Bewildered" (Lorenz Hart, Richard Rodgers) - 4:26
 "I Can't Get Started" (Vernon Duke, Ira Gershwin) - 4:03
 "My Ship" (Gershwin, Kurt Weill) - 2:53
 "Skylark" (Hoagy Carmichael, Mercer) - 2:44
 "I Didn't Know What Time It Was"/"A Ship Without a Sail" (Hart, Rodgers)/(Hart, Rodgers) - 5:45
 "It Might as Well Be Spring" (Oscar Hammerstein II, Rodgers]) - 4:22
 "You're Gonna Hear from Me" (A. Previn, Dory Previn) - 3:49

Personnel 
 André Previn – piano
Production
 Amy Merxbauer – a&r
 Pat Barry – art direction
 Anthony Ruotolo – assistant engineer, audio engineer
 Mark Wilder – audio consultant, mastering
 Dave Darlington – audio engineer, engineer
 Robert Sadin – audio production, producer
 Pawel Mielnik – design
 Chris Roberts – executive producer
 Tom Amdt – package coordinator
 Lillian Birnbaum – photography
 Gerhard Feldmann – preparation
 Rigdzin Collins – production assistant
 Evelyn Morgan – production coordination

References 

2007 albums
André Previn albums
EmArcy Records albums
Solo piano jazz albums